The plant genus Caylusea is a small group of plants found in parts of Africa and India.
Caylusea abyssinica is eaten as a vegetable.

Selected species 

 Caylusea abyssinica Fisch. & C.A.Mey.
 Caylusea canescens Webb
 Caylusea canescens A.St.-Hil. (IK)
 Caylusea hexagyna (Forssk.) M.L.Green
 Caylusea jaberi Abedin 
 Caylusea latifolia P.Taylor
 Caylusea moquiniana Webb

External links
 International Plant Names Index

Resedaceae
Brassicales genera